Mirassolândia is a municipality in the state of São Paulo, Brazil. The population is of 4,919 inhabitants and the area is 166.2 km2.

Mirassolândia is located on the north of São Paulo state, 25 km from the city of São José do Rio Preto. The area is essentially rural.

External links
  http://www.mirassolandia.sp.gov.br
  citybrazil.com.br

References

Municipalities in São Paulo (state)